All visitors to Djibouti must obtain either a visa on arrival to Djibouti, an electronic visa online or a visa from one of the Djiboutian diplomatic missions prior to arrival in Djibouti, unless they come from one of the visa exempt countries mentioned below.

Visa exemptions

Nationals of  who hold ordinary passports do not require a visa to enter Djibouti, for an unlimited period of stay.

Additionally, nationals of  holding passports endorsed "for public affairs" do not require a visa to enter Djibouti, for an unlimited period of stay.

Visa on arrival

Visas on arrival are issued at the discretion of the Djibouti immigration authority. Passengers with a passport valid for a minimum of 6 months from the date of arrival are able to obtain a visa on arrival. They must hold a return/onward ticket. Visas are issued for stays of up to 90 days.

According to the government of Djibouti, nationals of any country who hold an ordinary passport are no longer allowed to obtain a visa on arrival as of 1 May 2018, and must obtain an eVisa online instead.
Nationals of any country who hold either a diplomatic, service or official passport can obtain a visa on arrival.

eVisa
On 18 February 2018, the government of Djibouti introduced an eVisa system for foreign visitors intended to replace the visa on arrival system. Visitors can apply for a transit visa valid for 3 days or a single entry visit visa valid for 31 days. eVisas are issued only for tourism or commerce purposes. Holders of eVisas can enter Djibouti through Ambouli International Airport or any other border crossing.

See also

Visa requirements for Djiboutian citizens

References 

Djibouti
Foreign relations of Djibouti